The Taipei Metro Xindian District Office station is a station on the Songshan–Xindian line located in Xindian District, New Taipei, Taiwan.

The station was originally called Hsintien City Hall station from 1999 until 2003, Xindian City Hall station from 2003 until 2009, then renamed Xindian City Office (same name in ) station for the remainder of 2009, and eventually renamed to the current name of Xindian District Office in 2010.

Station overview

This two-level, underground station, has two side platforms and two exits.

Station layout

Exits
Exit 1: Beixin Rd. Sec. 1 and Zhonghua Rd. (Xindian District Office) 
Exit 2: Beixin Sec. 1 Lane 88 and Beixin Rd. Sec. 1

Around the station
 Wufeng Junior High School
 Xindian Sports Center
 Liugong Park

References

Railway stations opened in 1999
1999 establishments in Taiwan
Songshan–Xindian line stations